Distress is a 1995 science fiction novel by Australian writer Greg Egan.

Plot summary
Distress describes the political intrigue surrounding a mid-twenty-first century physics conference, at which is to be presented a unified Theory of Everything.  In the background of the story is an epidemic mental illness, related in some way to the imminent discovery of the TOE.  The action takes place on an artificial island called "Stateless", which has earned the wrath of the world's large biotech companies for its pilfering of their intellectual property.

The narrator is a journalist for a science channel called SeeNet named Andrew Worth who carries video recording software in an intestinal implant. He is offered a story on a new illness called Distress, but declines. He journeys to Stateless through a series of convoluted flights to cover a presentation by 27-year-old South African physicist Violet Mosala, supplanting the preproduction by a colleague, Sarah Knight. When he arrives, he is informed by an asex anthrocosmologist named Akili that Violet's life is in danger. Violet is finishing her Theory of Everything, which she intends to present on the conference's last day.

Through interfacing with a talkative local, Worth learns that Violet plans to emigrate to Stateless after the conference to use her celebrity status to provide an opportunity for South Africa and other nations to end their support for the United Nations boycott of Stateless. He also witnesses the islands' physical underpinnings: it is basically held up by the activity of millions of micro-organisms. After meeting with a faction of anthrocosmologists, he learns that they believe in the concept that the universe is created by one person's Theory of Everything. That person is called the Keystone.

Worth becomes deathly ill and believes he has been infected with cholera by a faction of anthrocosmologists who wanted him to transmit the disease to Violet Mosala.  He recovers and is kidnapped by this group, who are led by a rival physicist Worth saw with Violet at the conference.  Worth and Akili are held on a tanker where it is explained that these cultists believe Violet's TOE will destroy the world.  Worth signals for help by connecting his implant to a port on the ship.  He and Akili are rescued by citizens of Stateless.

Worth returns to the conference and learns that a biotech conglomerate sent a militia to Stateless, angry at the technology they have appropriated. He negotiates with the militia to let a suddenly ill Violet return to South Africa, where she dies. Before her illness, however, she tasked an AI to synthesize her final theory. The militia moves to take over the main city of Stateless, brutalizing the citizens as they evacuate to the outskirts. While seemingly helpless to do anything at first, they soon strike back at the invaders by having triggered microorganisms consume the cities structural underpinning, sinking it into the ocean. Worth is fired from SeeNet and Sarah Knight replaces him, covering the war. Worth discovers that Sarah was working with the cultists, and that AIs are exhibiting symptoms of the titular mental illness as well. Believing that the AI that wrote the paper became the Keystone and that Distress will continue until a human reads it, Worth downloads and reads the paper, and realizes that all minds, together, collaborate in being "the" Keystone, giving all of humanity an intuitive connection with the universe.

Themes
The novel contains a great deal of commentary on gender identities, multinational capitalism, and postmodern thought.  It also features Egan's usual playful exploration of physical, metaphysical, and epistemological theories.

Gender roles
Egan uses his hypothetical future to postulate the existence of not just one but five new genders, and introduces a  set of new pronouns for gender neutral people.  One of the central characters of the novel, Akili Kuwale, provides a demonstration of this change and its implications.  As an asexual human, Akili has had all reproductive organs removed entirely.  Within the scope of the novel, Egan uses the pronouns 've', 'ver', and 'vis' to represent Akili's definitive gender neutrality.

Anarchism
Egan also uses the hypothetical technological advances in Distress to explore ideas about anarchism, especially when its protagonist, Andrew Worth, a journalist, travels to the anarchistic man-made island named Stateless. Andrew meets some minor characters on Stateless who explain to him the relationship between anarchistic principles and various ideas such as quantum physics, information theory and independent spirituality.

Worth also meets a painter, Munroe, who attempts to explain how anarchy functions on Stateless.

Munroe is an Australian as are Andrew Worth and Greg Egan himself. Egan uses Munroe to deliver a critique of Australian culture.

A major theme running through Egan's presentation of a futuristic anarchism is something called 'Technolibération', which is to do with the liberation of technology and information from corporate control as well as the idea of using advanced technology to enable liberatory social movements.

References

External links
 Official Website

1995 Australian novels
Transhumanist books
Aurealis Award-winning works
Novels by Greg Egan
Australian science fiction novels
Anarchist fiction
Novels about artificial intelligence